This is a list of 621 species in the genus Eurytoma.

Eurytoma species

References